Kushk-e Bala (also Romanized as Kūshḵ-e Bālā) is a village in Adaran Rural District, Asara District, Karaj County, Alborz Province, Iran. At the 2006 census, its population was 174, in 45 families.

References 

Populated places in Karaj County